Madison Township is one of the fourteen townships of Perry County, Ohio, United States.  The 2000 census found 1,229 people in the township.

Geography
Located in the northeastern corner of the county, it borders the following townships:
Hopewell Township, Muskingum County – north
Newton Township, Muskingum County – east
Clayton Township – south
Pleasant Township – southwest corner
Hopewell Township – west
Bowling Green Township, Licking County – northwest corner

No municipalities are located in Madison Township, although the unincorporated community of Mount Perry lies in the township's north.

Name and history
It is one of twenty Madison Townships statewide.

Government
The township is governed by a three-member board of trustees, who are elected in November of odd-numbered years to a four-year term beginning on the following January 1. Two are elected in the year after the presidential election and one is elected in the year before it. There is also an elected township fiscal officer, who serves a four-year term beginning on April 1 of the year after the election, which is held in November of the year before the presidential election. Vacancies in the fiscal officership or on the board of trustees are filled by the remaining trustees.

References

External links
County website
History of Madison Township (1883)

Townships in Perry County, Ohio
Townships in Ohio